Aredla Jagadeeshwar Reddy, popularly known as Jagga Reddy, is an Indian politician who is the current Working President of Telangana Pradesh Congress Committee since 28 June 2021. He is the current Member of Telangana Legislative Assembly for Sangareddy constituency.

Political career
He started career as a councilor in BJP and then became municipal chairman. He won as TRS MLA in 2004, left the party to join the Congress. He was re-elected in 2009, but had lost in 2014.
He contested 2014 by poll from Medak (Lok Sabha constituency) being BJP candidate and lost. He again joined Congress in 2015.

Allegations 
In September 2018 he was detained on charges of impersonation, forgery, cheating and human trafficking on allegations that Reddy in 2004 trafficked three persons from Hyderabad to the United States using passports secured on the names of his wife, daughter and son.

References

Living people
1966 births
Telangana politicians
People from Sangareddy district
Bharatiya Janata Party politicians from Telangana
Indian National Congress politicians from Telangana
Telangana Rashtra Samithi politicians
Telangana MLAs 2018–2023